John L. Bartlett is a Democratic member of the Indiana House of Representatives, representing the 95th District since 2007.

In 2015, at age 66, Barrlett earned a Bachelor's degree from Martin University.

References

External links
Indiana State Legislature - Representative John Bartlett Official government website
Project Vote Smart - Representative John L. Bartlett (IN) profile
 John Bartlett at ballotpedia.org

Democratic Party members of the Indiana House of Representatives
Living people
Politicians from Indianapolis
African-American state legislators in Indiana
21st-century American politicians
Year of birth missing (living people)
21st-century African-American politicians